The Green Bay Phoenix, previously known as the UW–Green Bay Phoenix and UWGB Phoenix, are the athletic teams of the University of Wisconsin–Green Bay. A total of 15 Phoenix athletic teams compete in the Horizon League of NCAA Division I. The school does not sponsor an American football team.

Teams

A member of the Horizon League, the University of Wisconsin-Green Bay sponsors teams in six men's, eight women's, and one coed NCAA sanctioned sport (cross-country skiing).

Women's basketball

During the 2008/09-2012/13 seasons, the Green Bay women's basketball team had the third highest winning-percentage in the NCAA Division I with a 175–21 mark trailing only Connecticut and Stanford. The Phoenix has the fifth-most wins in Division I during that same stretch. The Phoenix entered the 2017–18 season on a string of 40 consecutive winning seasons, with only Tennessee having a longer such streak in women's college basketball. Green Bay has won or tied for the Horizon League regular-season championship since 2000, the longest active streak in Division I NCAA women's basketball. In those 17 years, the team has only lost the conference tournament three times, in the 2000–01, 2009–10, and 2013–14 seasons. Since the 2002–03 season, Green Bay has been ranked in the top 25 polls, with the highest ranking being #9 at the conclusion of the 2010–11 season when they made it to the Sweet 16 where they lost to the University of Baylor, 86–76. They have been to the NCAA tournament 18 times, advancing to the second round five times and to the Sweet 16 once.

Men's basketball 

The men's basketball team has appeared in the NCAA Tournament five times, most recently in 2016.

Softball 
In the 2005 season, they claimed their first Horizon League tournament championship after being picked to finish last in the conference.  They went on to the national tournament, where they defeated #6 seed Oregon State in the first round of the tournament. They also won both the Horizon League regular season title as well as the Horizon League tournament title in 2014.

Notable sports figures

Athletes

Tony Bennett, former NBA basketball player and current men's head basketball coach at the University of Virginia
Alec Brown, former NBA player, currently playing overseas
Sandy Cohen,  basketball player in the Israeli Basketball Premier League
Alfonzo McKinnie, NBA player, currently playing in the NBA G League
Jeff Nordgaard, former NBA basketball player
Tosaint Ricketts, professional soccer player for FK Sūduva and Canada men's national soccer team
Keifer Sykes, professional basketball player, currently playing in the NBA G League
Logan Vander Velden, former NBA basketball player

Coaches
Dick Bennett, former head basketball coach (and father of the aforementioned Tony Bennett)
Kevin Borseth, current women's head basketball coach

References

External links